Vitalie Plămădeală  (born 21 January 1985 in Moldova) is a Moldovan footballer currently under contract for Sfântul Gheorghe Suruceni.

Club career

Sfîntul Gheorghe

During the period at the team, he was the eldest player of Sfîntul Gheorghe and soon had become the captain.

Zimbru Chişinău
During the 2010 summer transfer period he moved to Zimbru, where he, actually, had started as a footballer.
He made his debut at the team on 25 July 2010 playing the first match of the season against FC Sfîntul Gheorghe, his former team.

He scored his first goal on 23 April 2011 during an away match against FC Milsami.

International career
Soon after his appointment as the coach of the National Team, Gavril Balint had chosen Vitalie Plămădeală as a national team player for a friendly match against the team of foreigners from the National Division (Moldova won 2–0).

References

External links
Profile at moldova.sports.md

1985 births
Living people
Moldovan footballers
Association football midfielders
FC Rapid Ghidighici players
FC Iskra-Stal players
FC Sfîntul Gheorghe players
FC Zimbru Chișinău players
PFK Nurafshon players
Speranța Nisporeni players
CS Petrocub Hîncești players
Moldovan Super Liga players
Uzbekistan Super League players
Moldovan expatriate footballers
Expatriate footballers in Uzbekistan
Moldovan expatriate sportspeople in Uzbekistan